Néstor Olguín (born May 29, 1988 in Xalapa, Veracruz) is a former professional Mexican footballer who last played for Atlético Veracruz.

He played with Atlético Veracruz  of the Liga de Balompié Mexicano during the league's inaugural season, leading them to a runners-up finish after losing to Chapulineros de Oaxaca in the finals.

References

External links

 

1988 births
Living people
Mexican footballers
People from Xalapa
Association football midfielders
Pioneros de Cancún footballers
Albinegros de Orizaba footballers
C.D. Veracruz footballers
Atlético San Luis footballers
Club Necaxa footballers
Club Atlético Zacatepec players
Correcaminos UAT footballers
Cafetaleros de Chiapas footballers
Liga de Balompié Mexicano players